The 2010–11 Football Conference season was the seventh season with the Conference consisting of three divisions and the thirty-second season overall. The Conference covers the top two levels of Non-League football in England. The Conference Premier is the fifth highest level of the overall pyramid, whilst the Conference North and Conference South exist at the sixth level. The top team and the winner of the play-off of the National division were promoted to Football League Two, while the bottom four were relegated to the North or South divisions. The champions of the North and South divisions were promoted to the National division, alongside the play-off winners from each division. The bottom three in each of the North and South divisions were relegated to the premier divisions of the Northern Premier League, Isthmian League or Southern League.

For sponsorship reasons, the Conference Premier is referred to as the Blue Square Bet Premier.

Conference Premier

A total of 24 teams will contest the division, including 18 sides from last season, two relegated from the Football League Two, two promoted from the Conference North and two promoted from the Conference South.

Promotion and relegation
Teams promoted from 2009–10 Conference North
 Southport 
 Fleetwood Town

Teams promoted from 2009–10 Conference South
 Newport County
 Bath City

Teams relegated from 2009–10 League Two
 Darlington
 Grimsby Town

League table

Play-offs

Semifinals

AFC Wimbledon won 8–1 on aggregate.

Luton Town won 5–1 on aggregate.

Final

Stadia and locations

Results

Conference North

A total of 22 teams contested the division, including 18 sides from last season, one transferred from the Conference South and three promoted from the lower leagues.

Promotion and relegation
Teams promoted from 2009–10 Northern Premier League Premier Division
 Guiseley
 Boston United

Teams promoted from 2009–10 Southern League Premier Division
 Nuneaton Town

Teams transferred from 2009–10 Conference South
 Worcester City

League table

Play-offs

Semifinals

AFC Telford United won 3–2 on aggregate.

Guiseley 3–3 Boston United on aggregate. Guiseley won 3–2 on penalties.

Final

Stadia and locations

Results

Conference South

A total of 22 teams contested the division, including 18 previously competing sides, one relegated from the Conference Premier and three promoted from the lower leagues.

Promotion and relegation
Teams promoted from 2009–10 Isthmian League Premier Division
 Dartford
 Boreham Wood

Teams promoted from 2009–10 Southern League Premier Division
 Farnborough

Teams relegated from 2009–10 Conference Premier
 Ebbsfleet United

League table

Play-offs

Semifinals

Farnborough won 2–1 on aggregate.

Ebbsfleet United won 6–2 on aggregate.

Final

Stadia and locations

Results

References

 
National League (English football) seasons
Eng
5